Otto von Bülow (16 October 1911 – 5 January 2006) was a German U-boat commander in World War II, and a captain in the Bundesmarine. He was a recipient of the Knight's Cross of the Iron Cross with Oak Leaves of Nazi Germany.

Family
Bülow was born in Wilhelmshaven as the son of Captain Otto von Bülow (1874–1930) and Johanna Meyer (1883–1937). He was descended from the Bülow family, an old aristocratic family from Mecklenburg. On 5 June 1937 he married Helga Christiansen (born 2 April 1914 in Rødding, Denmark, then a part of Germany). Bülow was the chairman (1970–1988) and afterwards honorary chairman of the Bülow Family Association.

Military career
Bülow joined the Kriegsmarine on 1 April 1930, and completed his basic training in Stralsund. His first assignment was on the Niobe, a German training ship, from July until October 1930. He then served on the Light Cruiser Emden until the start of 1932. He then went back to Stralsund for more training, and between 1932 and 1933 he trained at the Naval Academy Mürwik.

In 1933 he was stationed on the cruiser Deutschland, where he was Battery commander.

In April 1940 Bülow transferred to the U-boat service, and completed his training on 11 November 1940. He sank 15 ships whilst in U-404, including a Royal Navy destroyer, and damaged 2 other ships.
On 1 September 1943 he was reassigned as commander of the 23rd U-boat Flotilla based in Danzig.

In May 1945, Bülow was taken prisoner by the British, and was released in August of that year. In 1956 he joined the Bundeswehr and was the garrison chief of Bremerhaven. He received command of the German Destroyer Z-6 in 1962. In 1963, he became commander of the 3rd Destroyer Squadron. Before he retired in 1970 he was the garrison chief of Hamburg for five years. He died in Wohltorf.

Summary of career

Awards
 Iron Cross (1939) 2nd Class (6 April 1942) & 1st Class (6 April 1942)
 Wehrmacht Long Service Award 4th Class
 U-boat War Badge (1939) with  Diamonds (April 1943)
 Knight's Cross of the Iron Cross with Oak Leaves
 Knight's Cross on 20 October 1942 as Kapitänleutnant and commander of U-404
 234th Oak Leaves on 26 April 1943 as Kapitänleutnant and commander of U-404
 War Merit Cross 2nd Class (20 April 1944)
Officer's Cross, Order of Merit of the Federal Republic of Germany

Ranks achieved
Kriegsmarine: Korvettenkapitän (Corvette Captain), effective as of 1 June 1943
Bundesmarine: Kapitän zur See (Captain at Sea) on 1 October 1962

References

Citations

Bibliography

 
 
 

1911 births
2006 deaths
Otto von Bulow
Reichsmarine personnel
German Navy personnel
Officers Crosses of the Order of Merit of the Federal Republic of Germany
People from Wilhelmshaven
People from the Province of Hanover
Recipients of the Knight's Cross of the Iron Cross with Oak Leaves
U-boat commanders (Kriegsmarine)
Military personnel from Lower Saxony